Monte George Basbas (May 6, 1921 – May 25, 2013) was an American lawyer and politician who served as mayor of Newton, Massachusetts from 1966 to 1971.

References

External links
 

1921 births
2013 deaths
Boston University School of Law alumni
Dartmouth College alumni
Politicians from Manchester, New Hampshire
Politicians from Newton, Massachusetts
20th-century American politicians
United States Army Air Forces personnel of World War II